Trybuna Ludu (People's Tribune) was one of the largest newspapers in communist Poland, which circulated between 1948 and 1990. It was the official media outlet of the Polish United Workers' Party (PZPR) and one of its main propaganda outlets along with the televised news program Dziennik.

History

Creation
On 16 December 1948, Poland's two largest communist parties, the Polish Socialist Party and the Polish Workers' Party, were combined to form the Polish United Workers' Party. The parties' respective newspapers, Robotnik, and Głos Ludu, were merged as well, forming the Trybuna Ludu.

Significance
Through the 20th century, the media in Poland were entirely controlled by the PZPR and newspapers were no exception. Trybuna Ludu and its smaller competitors promoted the party line. This newspaper had a significant role in spreading communist propaganda during the communist domination in the Polish People's Republic. It was also responsible for "rewriting history".

As the official party newspaper, Trybuna Luda dominated the market. By the end of 1981, circulation topped 1 million. Despite growing opposition to the party, the number of Trybuna Ludu subscribers continued to grow and reached nearly 1.9 million by the time the communist state was dissolved.

Party dissolution and aftermath
The break-up of the PZPR began on 28 January 1990, just hours after the final issue of Trybuna Ludu was printed. Despite an attempted relaunch as Trybuna Kongresowa, the paper was unable to survive the fall of communism in Poland.

After 1990, much of its editorial was taken over unofficially by Trybuna, a newly-created left-wing newspaper. Even at its peak, Trybuna had just 50,000 readers, and could not make money. Printing was halted in late 2009.

Editors-in-chief

References

Notes

See also
 Eastern Bloc information dissemination
 
 

Communist newspapers
Defunct newspapers published in Poland
Eastern Bloc mass media
Publications established in 1948
Publications disestablished in 1990